is a former Japanese football player. He played for Japan national team. His younger brother Toshimi is also a former footballer.

Club career
Kikuchi was born in Tono on April 12, 1967. After graduating from high school, he joined Japan Soccer League club Yomiuri (later Verdy Kawasaki, Tokyo Verdy) in 1986. The club won league champions 3 times, JSL Cup 1 time and Emperor's Cup 2 times. In Asia, the club also won 1987 Asian Club Championship. In 1992, Japan Soccer League was folded and founded new league J1 League. The club won the league champions in 1993 and 1994. The club also won 1992, 1993, 1994 J.League Cup and 1996 Emperor's Cup. He was a central player in golden era in both clubs history. In 1999, he lost opportunity to play behind Kenji Honnami. In 2000, Kikuchi moved to Kawasaki Frontale on loan. In 2001, he returned to Tokyo Verdy and retired with his rival Honnami end of the season.

National team career
On September 27, 1994, Kikuchi debuted for Japan national team against Australia. In October, he played all matches at 1994 Asian Games. He was also selected Japan for 1995 King Fahd Cup. But he did not play in the match, as he was the team's reserve goalkeeper behind Shigetatsu Matsunaga. He played 7 games for Japan until 1995.

Club statistics

National team statistics

Awards
J.League Best XI - 1994, 1995

References

External links

 
 Japan National Football Team Database
 

1967 births
Living people
Association football people from Iwate Prefecture
Japanese footballers
Japan international footballers
Japan Soccer League players
J1 League players
Tokyo Verdy players
Kawasaki Frontale players
1995 King Fahd Cup players
Association football goalkeepers
Footballers at the 1994 Asian Games
Asian Games competitors for Japan